Sir Daniel Morris  (1844–1933) was a British administrator, horticulturist and botanist, who worked mainly in the Caribbean region. He was knighted in 1903.

Biography
After public school at Cheltenham, he was educated at the Royal College of Science South Kensington and at Trinity College Dublin, where he took first class honours in natural science. From 1877 to 1879 he was Assistant Director of the Royal Botanic Gardens in Ceylon, where he studied coffee leaf rust. He married in 1879. From 1879 to 1886 he was Director of the Botanic Department in Jamaica; he collected botanical specimens in British Honduras in 1882. From 1886 to 1898 he was Assistant Director (under William Thiselton-Dyer) of the Royal Botanic Gardens, Kew. From 1898 to 1908 Morris was Imperial Commissioner, West Indian Agricultural Department. From 1908 to 1913 he was Scientific Advisor in Tropical Agriculture to the Colonial Office.

Selected publications

References

External links
National Portrait Gallery - Portrait - Sir Daniel Morris

Botanists with author abbreviations
British botanists
People educated at Cheltenham College
Alumni of Trinity College Dublin
Fellows of the Linnean Society of London
Knights Commander of the Order of St Michael and St George
Scientists from Swansea
1844 births
1933 deaths